The Consulate General of Peru in Nagoya is one of two diplomatic representations of Peru in Japan, the other two being the embassy and consulate in Tokyo. The office was established in 2008.

The current consul general is Luis Alfredo Espinoza Aguilar.

List of Consuls general
Eduardo Manuel Alfredo Llosa Larrabure (2008)
Luis Gilberto Mendívil Canales (2008–2010)
Carlos Alberto Ríos Segura (interim, 2010–2011)
Gustavo Adolfo Peña Chamot (2011–2017)
Antonio Pedro Miranda Sisniegas (2017–2022)
Julissa de Jesús Alegre (interim, 2022)
Luis Alfredo Espinoza Aguilar (since 2022)

Overview
The consulate general's jurisdiction extends to the following prefectures and regions:

See also
Embassy of Peru, Tokyo
Consulate General of Peru, Tokyo

References

Peru
Nagoya
Japan–Peru relations